Leptobrachium leishanense, the Leishan spiny toad or Leishan moustache toad, is a species of frog in the family Megophryidae. It is endemic to China: it is only known from the vicinity of its type locality in Leishan County in Guizhou. Its natural habitats are moist lowland forests, moist montane forests, and rivers. It is threatened by habitat loss and overexploitation.

References

leishanense
Amphibians of China
Endemic fauna of China
Taxonomy articles created by Polbot
Amphibians described in 1973
Endangered Fauna of China